Alexander Lieven may refer to:
 Alexander Karlovich Lieven (1801-1880),General in the Imperial Russian Army and Governor of Taganrog
 Alexander Alexanderovich Lieven (1860-1914), Admiral in the Imperial Russian Navy
 Alexander Pavlovich Lieven (1919-1988)